Guy Lelièvre (March 20, 1952 – March 29, 2021) was a Quebec politician and lawyer. He was the Member of National Assembly of Quebec for the riding of Gaspé. He represented the Parti Québécois from 1994 to 2008.

Lelièvre went to the Université du Québec à Montréal and obtained a bachelor's degree in juridical sciences in 1977 and was admitted to the Quebec Bar in 1979, where he practiced law for 15 years. He was also an administration member of several regional associations in the Gaspé region which promote development. He was also an active member of the Parti Québécois since 1990 and was a member of the NO coalition of Charlottetown Accord in 1992.

Lelièvre was first elected in Gaspé in 1994 and re-elected in 1998. He was named from 1999 to 2002 the parliamentary secretary to the Minister of natural resources. He was re-elected in 2003 and 2007 and served as the PQ critic for revenue, public security and information access. He did not seek re-election in 2008.

Electoral record

External links
 

1952 births
2021 deaths
Parti Québécois MNAs
Lawyers in Quebec
Université du Québec à Montréal alumni
21st-century Canadian politicians
French Quebecers